Gareh or Goreh or Gorah or Garreh or Gorreh may refer to:

Goreh, Bushehr (گره - Gareh)
Gareh, Fars (گاره - Gāreh)
Gareh, Rostam, Fars Province (گره - Gareh)
Gareh, Keshvar, Lorestan Province (گاره - Gāreh)
Gareh, Tang-e Haft, Lorestan Province (گره - Gareh)